The following list is a comparison of elevation absolutes in Switzerland. Data includes interval measures of highest and lowest elevation for all 26 cantons, with coordinates of the highest. Location names, mean elevation, and the numeric differences between high and low elevations are also provided.

Most of the 26 canton high points are located in the Swiss Alps. Others (with lower altitudes), are located in the Jura Mountains. The 14 lower summits (up to the Säntis) are within the hiking trail network. The ascent of the 11 higher summits involves rock climbing or glacier touring.

References 

Catherine Keller and Patrick Höhener: Höhepunkte der Schweiz: Die Gipfel aller Kantone; Les sommets de la Suisse: canton par canton  Travel descriptions  with map and photos
BfS Kennzahlen—XLS spreadsheet with list
:sv:Schweiz kantoner—Infoboxes with values
Die Kantone nach ihren höchsten Punkten   Various highest and lowest elevation values by canton (village center, road or rail network, etc.)

See also 
Extreme points of Switzerland

by highest point
Cantons, elevation
Cantons
Switzerland, highest points of cantons
 
Lowest points